Furniture repair is the craft of making broken or worn furniture usable again.  It may include the preservation of old furniture, which is referred to as restoration. The craft of furniture repair requires a number of different skills including woodworking, metalworking, wood finishing, caning (furniture), woodturning, and upholstery.

Woodworking repair
Wood is most abundantly used raw material to make a furniture piece. Wood provides the structure for upholstered pieces and is what finishes are applied to.  Repairing wood requires knowledge of:
 Types of wood
 Types of furniture joinery
 Types of glue
 Woodworking techniques
 Woodworking tools

Some woodworking repairs can be done as DIY projects while others require more skilled woodworkers to complete.  The most complex repairs involve reproducing replacement parts as well as restoring antiques.

Finish repair
Refinishing means the existing finish is removed before a new finish is applied, whereas restoration refers to the process in which the original finish is cleaned, revived, and protected. Restoration protects the history and value of antique furniture.

Finish repair requires understanding the types of finishes and the corresponding techniques to clean, repair, and apply the finishes.  The most common finishes include:
 Boiled linseed oil
 Tung oil
 Wax
 Shellac
 Lacquer
 Polyurethane

Reupholstery
The process of recovering a piece of upholstered furniture with new fabric is called reupholstery.  It begins with removing the existing upholstery, including the dust cover, tacks, fabric, muslin, padding, burlap, webbing, and springs.  Once the furniture has been stripped of all upholstery, it can be repaired as the wooden joints of old furniture typically become loose.  New upholstery should be reinstalled with considerations of reusing some of the old materials, such as horsehair, or replacing it with new materials.

Antique restoration
Antiques need to be handled with care to preserve their value. As a rule of thumb, restoring up to 30 percent of the piece is acceptable on an antique. Any more than 30 percent seriously undermines the value.

Modern glue should not be used on the joints of antique furniture.  Hide glue should be used as can be disassembled in the future if repairs are needed.

Furniture repair industry
This industry is involved in reupholstering, refinishing, repairing and restoring furniture. The NIACS industry code is 811420 and includes:
 Reupholstering furniture
 Refinishing furniture
 Repairing and restoring furniture

Entertainment
 The Repair Shop is a British television show
 "Furniture To Go" was a television show on PBS by Ed Feldman and Joe L'Erario

References

Decorative arts
Furniture
Woodworking